Robert Mehlen (born 12 May 1949 in Luxembourg City) is a Luxembourgish politician, President of the Alternative Democratic Reform Party (ADR), and farmer. He has sat in the Chamber of Deputies since the ADR's spectacular breakthrough in the 1989 election, representing the agrarian Circonscription Est.  He has been the party's president since 1991, replacing John Bram.

Footnotes

Members of the Chamber of Deputies (Luxembourg)
Members of the Chamber of Deputies (Luxembourg) from Est
Alternative Democratic Reform Party politicians
Luxembourgian farmers
1949 births
Living people
People from Luxembourg City